Rhyme of Vengeance is a 1978 Japanese film, directed by Kon Ichikawa. It is based on Seishi Yokomizo's novel of the same title.  It is 4th in Kon Ichikawa and Koji Ishizaka`s Kindaichi film series.

Plot
In the Daidoji family of Izu, a man  accomplished a mortal death. Kosuke Kindaichi visits the Daidoji family to investigate the case at the request of lawyer Kanoh in Kyoto immediately after the incident.

Cast
Kōji Ishizaka as Kosuke Kindaichi
Keiko Kishi as Hediko Kamio
Takeshi Katō as Detective Todoroki
Mitsuko Kusabue as Otomi
Shigeru Kōyama 
Katsuhiko Sasaki as Hitoshi 
Akiji Kobayashi as Detective Kogure
Ryōko Sakaguchi as Oaki
Yōko Tsukasa
Junzaburō Ban as Arashi Sanchō
Tarō Ishida as Usa Saburō
Tsuyoshi Sasaki as Komai
Hideji Ōtaki as Kanō
Kie Nakai as Tomoko Daidōji
Masaya Oki as Rentarō Tamon
Tatsuya Nakadai as  Ginzō Daidōji

See also
Byoinzaka no Kubikukuri no Ie 5th in Kon Ichikawa and Kōji Ishizaka's Kindaichi series.

References

External links

Films directed by Kon Ichikawa
Films with screenplays by Kon Ichikawa
1970s Japanese films